The Polish Communist Party (KPP), or the Communist Party of Poland, is an anti-revisionist Marxist–Leninist communist party in Poland founded in 2002 claiming to be the historical and ideological heir of the Communist Party of Poland, Polish Workers' Party and the Polish United Workers' Party.

History 
The Communist Party of Poland was founded in July 2002 in Dąbrowa Górnicza by activists largely derived from the Union of Polish Communists "Proletariat", which had existed since 1990 and was liquidated by the state authorities due to formal procedures.

The first congress of the party took place in December 2002, the second - in December 2006, the third - in December 2010, the fourth - in March 2015, and the fifth in July 2019.

In the Polish parliamentary elections in 2005 and 2007, KPP members started from the lists of the Polish Labour Party (PPP). In the 2005 Polish presidential election, the party supported Daniel Podrzycki of the PPP (who died shortly before the election in a road accident). Before the 2010 Polish presidential election, the chairman of the party Józef Łachut expressed at the Congress of the Left Alliance support for the candidacy of Grzegorz Napieralski from the Democratic Left Alliance (SLD).

In 2010 Polish local elections the party formed an election committee (Red Wrocław Election Committee) and put forward candidates for the Wrocław city council. In the 2011 Polish parliamentary election, individual members of the KPP started to the Sejm from the lists of the SLD or PPP.

The Communist Party of Poland called for a boycott of the 2015 Polish parliamentary election. In addition, it established contacts with the Polish Left. In the 2019 Polish parliamentary election, the KPP put forward one candidate to The Left for the Sejm. Before the 2020 Polish presidential election, the Communist Party of Poland supported the candidacy of Waldemar Witkowski from Labour Union. The KPP is no longer part of The Left political alliance.

Party program 
The Communist Party of Poland proclaims anti-capitalist and anti-imperialist slogans. It seeks to introduce socialism and take over political and economic power by the proletariat. It also calls for the replacement of capitalist property by social ownership through the nationalization of industry, trade and natural resources. They advocate broad social rights (including free and universal education and free healthcare). The party is for equality and full separation of the Church and the state (including non-financing by the state of religious associations and withdrawal of religious instruction from public schools). They also postulates cessation of privatization and reprivatization and tax reform (progressive tax system, limitation of VAT), as well as property vetting. It criticizes the liquidation of the Polish People's Republic and the political transformation. The KPP is also against Poland's participation in the European Union and NATO. In addition, the party strongly opposes the decommunization laws adopted by the Law and Justice government and the historical policy pursued by the Institute of National Remembrance.

At its website, the KPP glorified Joseph Stalin as the "Liberator of the Nations" and Kim Jong-Il as the "Great Leader", supported the leadership of North Korea and promoted the Katyn lie.

Chairmen
14 December 2002 to 8 December 2006 - Marcin Adam
8 December 2006 to 11 December 2010 - Józef Łachut
11 December 2010 – present - Krzysztof Szwej

Structure and activists 
The number of activists of the Communist Party of Poland over the years ranged from several hundred to over a thousand activists.

The KPP's highest executive body is the National Executive Committee. The central control body of the party is the National Statutory and Audit Commission. The body appointed to deal with individual cases of party members arising from appeals against resolutions of organs, including resolutions on exclusion from it, is the National Peer Court.

Newspaper 
The official newspaper of the party is ''Brzask'', published in subscription and available on the Internet.

Legal status and attempts at outlawing 
The existence of communist parties in Poland and their activities are legal as long as they refer to the ideology of the communist system, bypassing totalitarian methods and practices. Similarly, communist symbolism is not prohibited in Poland. The Polish Communist Party completely dissociates itself from the use of totalitarian methods.

In 2013, Law and Justice activist Bartosz Kownacki requested the party to be banned because of alleged propagation of totalitarianism. As a result of the investigation, the prosecutor's office did not find any evidence of a crime and discontinued the investigation. From 2015 to 2019, a trial was underway regarding the alleged promotion of the totalitarian system by KPP activists in ''Brzask''. On January 18, 2019, the District Court in Dąbrowa Górnicza found editors of the magazine "Brzask" innocent of the alleged offenses.

As part of solidarity with the KPP in connection with the court proceedings against it, in 2018 and 2019 protests under Polish embassies organized, among others The Communist Party of Greece, the Communist Party of Belgium and the Communist Party of Britain. In Poland, solidarity with the KPP was declared by the Democratic Left Alliance and Workers' Democracy.

In 2020, the Public Prosecutor General and Minister of Justice Zbigniew Ziobro requested the Constitutional Tribunal to ban the party, alleging that it had a totalitarian ideology and wanted to seize power violently.

References

2002 establishments in Poland
Anti-revisionist organizations
Neo-Stalinist parties
Communist parties in Poland
Political parties established in 2002
Political parties in Poland
International Meeting of Communist and Workers Parties